The 1971–72 Segunda División season was the 41st since its establishment and was played between 4 September 1971 and 1 June 1972.

Overview before the season
20 teams joined the league, including two relegated from the 1970–71 La Liga and 5 promoted from the 1970–71 Tercera División.

Relegated from La Liga
Elche
Zaragoza

Promoted from Tercera División

Cultural Leonesa
Tenerife
Mestalla
Xerez
Valladolid

Teams

League table

Top goalscorers

Top goalkeepers

Results

Relegation playoffs

First leg

Second leg

External links
BDFútbol

Segunda División seasons
2
Spain